Francesco "Checco" Rissone (7 July 1909 – 26 September 1985) was an Italian film, stage and television actor.

Life and career 
Rissone was born in Turin, the younger brother of the more famous Giuditta. He debuted on stage at a young age and often worked in the same companies as his sister. Graduating in economics, in the post-war years Rissone specialized in character roles, in films, television and particularly on stage, often working at the Piccolo Teatro in Milan under the direction of Giorgio Strehler. At the Piccolo Teatro, he also worked as assistant director and later as teacher at the drama school of the theatre.

Partial filmography

 La segretaria per tutti (1933)
 Full Speed (1934) – Un ciclista (uncredited)
 Il signore desidera? (1934)
 These Children (1937)
 The Cuckoo Clock (1938) – Narciso
 Departure (1938) – Il fattore
 The Lady in White (1938) – L'autista del pullman a Cervinia
 Duetto vagabondo (1939)
 Ai vostri ordini, signora.. (1939)
 Scandalo per bene (1940)
 Centomila dollari (1940) – L'infermiere ambulanza
 The Two Mothers (1940)
 La granduchessa si diverte (1940)
 The Siege of the Alcazar (1940) – Il radiotelegrafista
 The Sinner (1940) – Tonio (uncredited)
 L'arcidiavolo (1940)
 Inspector Vargas (1940) – Roulis
 Ragazza che dorme (1941) – Lo scemo
 The Betrothed (1941) – Gervaso (uncredited)
 Finalmente soli (1942) – Paolo
 Odessa in Flames (1942) – Gruscenko
 A Living Statue (1943)
 Gente dell'aria (1943) – Il tenente Zaccheo
 The Peddler and the Lady (1943) – Giovanni (uncredited)
 T'amerò sempre (1943) – Un giovane mantenuto (uncredited)
 Enrico IV (1943) – Fino Pagliuca / Bertoldo
 La carica degli eroi (1943)
 The Priest's Hat (1944) – Filippino
 Nessuno torna indietro (1945) – Ignazio
 Incontro con Laura (1945)
 The Sun Still Rises (1946) – Mario
 Vanity (1947)
 Tragic Hunt (1947) – Mimì
 The Street Has Many Dreams (1948) – Donato
 Bicycle Thieves (1948) – Guard in Piazza Vittorio (uncredited)
 Bitter Rice (1949) – Aristide
 The Walls of Malapaga (1949) – Le faux-monnayeur / il contraffattore
 Patto col diavolo (1950)
 Il sentiero dell'odio (1950)
 Miracle in Milan (1951) – Il comandante in secondo
 Mamma Mia, What an Impression! (1951) – L'uomo del panino
 Bread, Love and Dreams (1953) – Barbiere
 Bread, Love and Jealousy (1954) – Barbiere
 Eva (1962) – Pieri
 Seasons of Our Love (1966) – Olindo Civinini
 La morte risale a ieri sera (1970) – Ing. Salvarsanti
 Come Have Coffee with Us (1970) – Mansueto
 Il generale dorme in piedi (1972) – Gen. Ciccolo

References

External links 
 

1909 births
1985 deaths
Italian male film actors
Italian male television actors
Italian male stage actors
Actors from Turin
20th-century Italian male actors